San Juan is a census-designated place (CDP) in Rio Arriba County, New Mexico, United States. The population was 592 at the 2000 census.

Geography
San Juan is located at  (36.053361, -106.069283), a few miles north of Espanola.

According to the United States Census Bureau, the CDP has a total area of 0.6 square mile (1.5 km), all land.

Demographics
As of the census of 2000, there were 592 people, 193 households, and 152 families residing in the CDP. The population density was 1,035.8 people per square mile (401.0/km). There were 227 housing units at an average density of 397.2 per square mile (153.8/km). The racial makeup of the CDP was 4.05% White, 0.34% African American, 84.97% Native American, 0.17% Asian, 7.60% from other races, and 2.87% from two or more races. Hispanic or Latino of any race were 27.03% of the population.

There were 193 households, out of which 39.9% had children under the age of 18 living with them, 40.9% were married couples living together, 27.5% had a female householder with no husband present, and 21.2% were non-families. 19.2% of all households were made up of individuals, and 6.2% had someone living alone who was 65 years of age or older. The average household size was 3.06 and the average family size was 3.39.

In the CDP, the population was spread out, with 31.4% under the age of 18, 8.6% from 18 to 24, 29.7% from 25 to 44, 19.4% from 45 to 64, and 10.8% who were 65 years of age or older. The median age was 32 years. For every 100 females, there were 86.8 males. For every 100 females age 18 and over, there were 76.5 males.

The median income for a household in the CDP was $26,667, and the median income for a family was $27,500. Males had a median income of $22,721 versus $19,250 for females. The per capita income for the CDP was $10,568. About 19.3% of families and 25.6% of the population were below the poverty line, including 40.4% of those under age 18 and 14.9% of those age 65 or over.

Economy
Most of the residents of San Juan are members of Ohkay Owingeh Pueblo, formerly San Juan Pueblo. Many work at the nearby Ohkay Casino Resort Hotel, a tribal Indian gaming enterprise.

See also 
 Ohkay Owingeh, New Mexico
 United States v. Sandoval

References

Census-designated places in Rio Arriba County, New Mexico
Census-designated places in New Mexico
Former colonial and territorial capitals in the United States